The Río Loro Formation is a geological formation of the Sierras Pampeanas in Tucumán Province Argentina whose strata date back to the Late Paleocene of the Paleogene, or Riochican in the SALMA classification.

The formation has provided fossils of several mammals and reptiles. The crocodylian genus Lorosuchus and mammal species Eoastrapostylops riolorense were named after the formation which is correlated with the Mealla Formation of the Salta Basin to the northwest of Tucumán Province.

Description 
The Río Loro Formation crops out in the Sierra Medina, north of Tucumán city.

The Río Loro Formation unconformably overlies the Cretaceous Los Blanquitos Formation and is overlain by the Río Nío Formation. The Río Loro Formation is correlated with the Mealla Formation of the Salta Basin to the northeast.

Fossil content 
The following fossils were reported from the formation:
 Mammals
 Notoungulates
 Satshatemnus bonapartei
 Eutheria	
 Notonychops powelli
 Xenungulata
 Rodcania kakan
 Placentalia
 Eoastrapostylops riolorense
 Reptiles
 Turtles
 Podocnemis cf. argentinensis
 Crocodylians
 Lorosuchus nodosus

See also 
 South American land mammal ages
 Itaboraí Formation

References

Bibliography 

 
  
 
 
 
 
 

Geologic formations of Argentina
Paleocene Series of South America
Paleogene Argentina
Thanetian Stage
Riochican
Sandstone formations
Siltstone formations
Fluvial deposits
Fossiliferous stratigraphic units of South America
Paleontology in Argentina
Geology of Tucumán Province